Yingxiu is a town of southern Wenchuan County, in northwestern Sichuan Province. It is located at the southern end of the Ngawa Tibetan and Qiang Autonomous Prefecture, and lies on the road to Jiuzhaigou Valley, Wolong and the Siguniang Mountains.

It is at the epicentre and one of the worst hit areas of the 2008 Sichuan earthquake. 80% of the town was destroyed and 5,462 people died. The collapsed Xuankou Middle School became one of the most memorable images of the disaster, and is now part of a memorial site.

Benevolence Square, a monument built by the Chinese government at the epicentre of the earthquake, contains a huge boulder lying below the surface and surrounded by a moat. A plaque, in Chinese and English, reads "Benevolence Square: It was arable land before the earthquake".

History 
Yingxiu was established as a People's commune in 1958.

In 1980, Yingxiu was changed to a township.

In 1984, Yingxiu was changed to a town, which it remains today.

Following the 2008 Sichuan earthquake, the Wenchuan County government built 479 resettlement homes for families displaced by the earthquake, which now constitute part of Xiuping Community.

On December 18, 2019,  was merged into Yingxiu.

Administrative divisions
Yingxiu is divided into one residential community and six administrative villages:

 Xiuping Community
 Zhongtanbao Village
 Yuzixi Village
 Huangjiayuan Village
 Dongjienao Village
 Yiwanshui Village
 Taoguan Village

Demographics 

The Wenchuan County government reports that, as of 2021, Yingxiu is home to 5,829 people, living in 1,999 households.

In the 2010 Chinese Census, the town's population was recorded at 2,468. This is a notable decline from 2007, when it was recorded to have a population of 6,906, and an even further decline from 2000, when the population was 7,977. A 1996 estimate placed the town's population at around 7,000 people.

References

External links
Yingxiu: epicentre of the earthquake – The Guardian
Wenchuan County Government Website

Towns in Sichuan
Wenchuan County
Cities destroyed by earthquakes